Hemicentin-1 is a protein that in humans is encoded by the HMCN1 gene.

This gene encodes a large extracellular member of the immunoglobulin superfamily. A similar protein in C. elegans forms long, fine tracks at specific extracellular sites that are involved in many processes such as stabilization of the germline syncytium, anchorage of mechanosensory neurons to the epidermis, and organization of hemidesmosomes in the epidermis. Mutations in this gene may be associated with age-related macular degeneration.

References

Further reading

Extracellular matrix proteins